Waterloo, Missouri may refer to the following places in the U.S. state of Missouri:
Waterloo, Clark County, Missouri, an unincorporated community
Waterloo, Lafayette County, Missouri, an unincorporated community